Tijana Rakić is a beauty queen from Serbia. On Miss Serbia pageant Tijana enter in top 5 and got a chance to represent her country in the Miss Earth 2010 pageant in Nha Trang, Vietnam.

Miss Earth 2010
As the official representative of her country to the 2010 Miss Earth pageant, she won title of Miss Aodai. At that night, Miss Serbia also won a sponsor award which is Miss Saigon Elegance but she didn't place in top 15.

References

Living people
Serbian female models
Serbian beauty pageant winners
Miss Earth 2010 contestants
1987 births
People from Kruševac